Diana Schoutsen Mendoza (born February 8, 1987) is a Canadian-Honduran beauty pageant titleholder who was crowned Miss Honduras 2013 and represented Honduras at the Miss Universe 2013 pageant.

Miss Universe Canada 2012
Diana competed in Miss Universe Canada 2012 and placed in the top 20.

Miss Honduras 2013
Diana Schoutsen Mendoza, representing Tela, was crowned Miss Universe Honduras 2013 at the conclusion of the pageant held September 10, 2013 at the Real Intercontinental Hotel in San Pedro Sula City. She then represented Honduras at the Miss Universe 2013 pageant on November 9, 2013, in Moscow, Russia but failed to place. During her reign as Miss Honduras, Mendoza was ridiculed for her inability to speak Spanish. She gained eligibility to enter the Miss Honduras pageant due to her mother being Honduran.

See also
 Kerenina Sunny Halim

References

External links
 Miss Honduras official website

1987 births
Living people
Miss Universe 2013 contestants
People from Hamilton, Ontario
Canadian beauty pageant winners
Canadian people of Dutch descent
Canadian people of Honduran descent